Hook Norton ironstone quarries may refer to:

 Hook Norton ironstone quarries (Baker)
 Hook Norton ironstone quarries (Brymbo)
 Hook Norton Ironstone Partnership